is a public company established in 1936 and based in Nagoya, Japan. NGK SPARK PLUG manufactures and sells spark plugs and related products for internal combustion engines, as well as sensors and ceramics for a wide range of applications.

NGK stands for Nihon Gaishi kabushikigaisha, the Japanese name of NGK Insulators.

As of April 2022, the company employs around 16,100 people, and operates a network of 60 group companies, 35 production plants, five Technical Centres and three Venture Labs worldwide. The company produces around one billion spark plugs worldwide each year.

In 2018 NGK SPARK PLUG acquired CAIRE Inc., a global manufacturer of oxygen supply equipment.

In 2021 NGK SPARK PLUG moved its headquarters to the N-Forest Building located at its Komaki Plant in Japan.

Operations

Germany 

NGK established its first European subsidiary, NGK Spark Plugs (U.K.) Ltd. in 1975. In 1979 they established their second European subsidiary, NGK Spark Plug Deutschland GmbH. Ten years later it was renamed NGK Spark Plug Europe GmbH when it took charge of operations in Europe. In 2017 its remit further expanded across the EMEA region.

NGK SPARK PLUG EUROPE has been run by Damien Germès, Regional President EMEA, President & CEO NGK SPARK PLUG EUROPE GmbH and Corporate Officer of the Global Headquarters in Japan, since April 2019 and it employs approximately 900 people in the EMEA region.

The European division has been operating a dedicated R&D unit since 1990. As well as designing and testing new prototype automotive products, the center develops technologies to combat issues such as vehicle exhaust emissions, and provides technical support to European car manufacturers in the EMEA region.

In 2017 the company opened a new European Regional Distribution Centre in Duisburg, Germany. It covers 21,000 m2 of shelf space, has a team of around 100 employees and supplies customers in 44 European countries.

In 2018, the company became a shareholder of the automotive aftermarket data firm TecAlliance.

France and South Africa
NGK SPARK PLUG EUROPE has six regional companies, two production plants in France and South Africa. Its EMEA sales account for 27% of NGK SPARK PLUG's global turnover in 2021. In its plants in South Africa and France, 55 million spark plugs are produced annually.

United States 

Established in 1966 NGK Spark Plugs (USA), Inc. was established as a subsidiary of NGK Spark Plug Co, Ltd., of Japan. Its corporate headquarters was first located in California and in 2005 moved to its current location in Wixom, Michigan to join the Technical Center operation that was created in 1996.

Michael Schwab is president and CEO of NGK Spark Plugs (U.S.A.), Inc., a corporate officer of NGK Spark Plug Co. LTD. (Japan), and Regional President for NGK Spark Plugs Canada, Mexico, and Australia.

The company has state-of-the-art manufacturing, inventory, and distribution facilities in Irvine, California, Sissonville, West Virginia, Chicago, Illinois, and has ISO 9002/QS-9000/ISO 14001 certification.

In 1978, NTK Ceramics (U.S.A.). Inc. was established and in 1982 the manufacture of automotive oxygen sensors began.

Products 
NGK SPARK PLUG supplies ignition and sensor products for 4-wheel, 2-wheel, ATV/SSV, snowmobile, agriculture, gardening, marine and industry applications. In the Aftermarket these products are supplied to parts wholesalers and distributors.

The company's ignition ranges include spark plugs, glow plugs, ignition coils and ignition leads and caps and are supplied under the NGK Ignition Parts brand.

Its vehicle electronics ranges include oxygen sensors, EGTS, MAP/MAF sensors, engine speed & position sensors and EGR valves, all supplied under the NTK Vehicle Electronics brand.

NGK is currently the only manufacturer of sodium-sulfur batteries in the World. In developing this technology NGK took advantage of its substantial experience with ceramic sodium beta-alumina used in its other products.

Additionally, the company's Technical Ceramics business unit produces semiconductor products, fine ceramics, cutting tools and products for the medical industry, under NTK Technical Ceramics.

Future 
Since 2018, NGK SPARK PLUG has created three ‘Venture Labs’ – innovation hubs designed to prepare the company for the future. They focus on three areas: Smart Health, Smart Mobility and Utility and are located in Tokyo, Japan; Silicon Valley, USA; and Berlin, Germany.

With the goal of achieving carbon neutrality by 2050, NGK SPARK PLUG has established ‘Eco Vision 2030’. Based on the United Nations’ ‘Sustainable Development Goals’, this vision sets the milestones for the company until the end of the 2020s and the following ten years leading up to 2040. The goal is to establish strong business pillars in the areas, Mobility, Medical, Environment & Energy and Communication. As part of this, the company launched a $100 million Corporate Venture Capital Fund in April 2021 to pursue new opportunities in these areas.

Motorsports involvement
NGK SPARK PLUG is also a supplier of the Scuderia Ferrari Formula 1 team. NGK SPARK PLUG was the exclusive spark plug supplier for the IndyCar Series from 2007 to 2011. Since 2012, the company has supplied only to Honda-powered IndyCar Series teams. Furthermore, NGK SPARK PLUG is supporting a couple of teams in racing categories such as MotoGP, Moto2, Moto3, the World Rally Championship, the Motocross World Championship, the FIM Trial World Championship and the Superbike World Championship. In 2022, NGK SPARK PLUG is the official technical partner to the X-raid motorsport team for the Dakar Rally.

World record
In 2018, a porcelain bushing insulator manufactured by NGK in Handa, Aichi Prefecture, was certified as the world’s largest ceramic structure by Guinness World Records. It is 11.3 m in height and 1.5 m in diameter.

See also
Insulator Museum

References

External links

Multinational companies headquartered in Japan
Manufacturing companies based in Nagoya
Auto parts suppliers of Japan
Ceramics manufacturers of Japan
Manufacturing companies established in 1936
Japanese brands
Companies listed on the Tokyo Stock Exchange
Swiss companies established in 1936